The 12th National Spelling Bee was held in Washington, D.C. on May 26, 1936, at the National Museum. Scripps-Howard did not sponsor the Bee until 1941.

The winner was Jean Trowbridge, age 13, of Stuart, Iowa, with the word eczema. Thirteen-year-old Bruce Ackerman, of Tazewell County, Illinois, who took 3rd the prior year, came in second. Catherine Davis, 13, of Indiana took third, falling on "shrieking".

In the final rounds, Trowbridge was first disqualified for "numskull", which Ackerman then spelled as "numbskull" followed by "gnome" for the apparent win. The judges then realized that "numskull" was an acceptable spelling, and the contest continued. Ackerman misspelled "predilection" a few words later, which Trowbridge spelled correctly followed by "eczema" for the win.

The final hour of the competition was broadcast on radio on the Columbia broadcasting system.

As of 2014, winner Jean Trowbridge (married name Tyler) was living in Grand Junction, Colorado.

First Black finalists
MacNolia Cox, a 13-year-old girl from Akron, and Elizabeth Kenny, a 15-year-old from Plainfield, New Jersey, were the first African-American children to compete as finalists in the National Spelling Bee—and Cox made it to the final five.

Due to segregation, Cox had to move into a black-only train car when she crossed into Maryland, and was unable to stay at the Willard Hotel with the other spellers. Cox and her mother were also placed at a separate table at the contestants' banquet. Cox was eliminated on the word "nemesis", and her schoolteacher and newspaper sponsor representative both protested the word as being a proper noun (Nemesis being a Greek goddess of retribution). However, the protest was denied as the word can also be used as a common noun. It's important to note that she did spell the word "Nemnesis". Some have since suggested that Cox was intentionally given an unapproved word (a capitalized word); any claims of racial bias were denied at the time, but are not surprising considering the segregated treatment that she received.

In 2004, poet A. Van Jordan published the book of poems "M-A-C-N-O-L-I-A" based on Cox's life experiences.

References

Scripps National Spelling Bee competitions
1936 in education
1936 in Washington, D.C.
May 1936 events